Stephen Richards Graubard (December 5, 1924 – May 27, 2021) was an American historian and author.

Books
Kissinger: Portrait of a Mind (W. W. Norton, 1973)
The Artificial Intelligence Debate: False Starts, Real Foundations (MIT Press, 1988)
Books, Bricks & Bytes: Libraries In The Twenty-First Century
Minnesota, Real & Imagined: Essays on the State and Its Culture (2000)
The Presidents: The Transformation Of The American Presidency From Theodore Roosevelt To George W. Bush (Penguin, 2004)

References

1924 births
2021 deaths
American historians
American writers